Georgetown (formerly Growlersburg) is a census-designated place (CDP) in El Dorado County, California. It is the northeasternmost town in the California Mother Lode. The population was 2,367 at the 2010 census, up from 962 in 2000. The town is registered as California Historical Landmark #484.

History
Founded August 7, 1849, by George Phipps and party, Georgetown was nicknamed "Growlersburg" due to the heavy, gold-laden quartz rocks that "growled" in the miners' pants as they walked around town. Georgetown is named for George Phipps. The first post office was established in 1851. After this new reconstruction, the residents of the city proclaimed their town as the "Pride of the Mountains". The hub of an immensely rich gold mining area, Georgetown had a population of about three thousand from 1854 to 1856. As a gold rush camp, the community outlasted many other towns, because the gold found nearby was solid primary deposits, as opposed to placer deposits. Gold production continued until after the turn of the 20th century.

Geography

For the 2000 census, the CDP's area was smaller.

Climate
According to the Köppen climate classification system, Georgetown has a warm-summer Mediterranean climate, abbreviated "Csa" on climate maps.

Demographics

The 2010 United States Census reported that Georgetown had a population of 2,367. The racial makeup of Georgetown was 2,128 (89.9%) White, 47 (2.0%) African American, 59 (2.5%) Native American, 18 (0.8%) Asian, 2 (0.1%) Pacific Islander, 45 (1.9%) from other races, and 68 (2.9%) from two or more races. Hispanic or Latino of any race were 177 persons (7.5%).

The Census reported that 2,239 people (94.6% of the population) lived in households, 14 (0.6%) lived in non-institutionalized group quarters, and 114 (4.8%) were institutionalized.

There were 913 households, out of which 242 (26.5%) had children under the age of 18 living in them, 521 (57.1%) were opposite-sex married couples living together, 66 (7.2%) had a female householder with no husband present, 64 (7.0%) had a male householder with no wife present.  There were 46 (5.0%) unmarried opposite-sex partnerships, and 7 (0.8%) same-sex married couples or partnerships. 218 households (23.9%) were made up of individuals, and 97 (10.6%) had someone living alone who was 65 years of age or older. The average household size was 2.45.  There were 651 families (71.3% of all households); the average family size was 2.82.

The population was spread out, with 441 people (18.6%) under the age of 18, 181 people (7.6%) aged 18 to 24, 513 people (21.7%) aged 25 to 44, 809 people (34.2%) aged 45 to 64, and 423 people (17.9%) who were 65 years of age or older.  The median age was 46.4 years. For every 100 females, there were 111.0 males.  For every 100 females age 18 and over, there were 114.7 males.

The homeowner vacancy rate was 3.5%; the rental vacancy rate was 8.1%.  1,689 people (71.4% of the population) lived in owner-occupied housing units and 550 people (23.2%) lived in rental housing units.

Politics

Education
The Black Oak Mine Unified School District, headquartered in Georgetown, serves Georgetown.

Notable people
 Ferris Fain

References

Census-designated places in El Dorado County, California
California Historical Landmarks
Populated places established in 1849
1849 establishments in California
Census-designated places in California